David Mayo (born August 18, 1993) is an American football linebacker for the Washington Commanders of the National Football League (NFL). He played college football at Texas State and was drafted by the Carolina Panthers in the fifth round of the 2015 NFL Draft. Mayo has also been a member of the San Francisco 49ers and New York Giants.

Early years
Mayo was born  in St. Helens, Oregon to Wayne Mayo and Lori Haggans. His family later moved to Scappoose, Oregon, where he played football, track and basketball for Scappoose High School. He played football for junior college, Santa Monica College, in California before transferring to play football for Texas State University.

Professional career

Carolina Panthers
The Carolina Panthers selected Mayo in the fifth round (169th overall) of the 2015 NFL Draft. He signed his four-year rookie contract, worth $2.44 million contract, on May 7, 2015. Mayo was part of the Panthers team that played in the Super Bowl 50 loss to the Denver Broncos.

San Francisco 49ers
On March 14, 2019, Mayo signed a two-year contract with the San Francisco 49ers. He was released on August 31, 2019.

New York Giants

On September 2, 2019, Mayo was signed by the New York Giants. In Week 5 against the New England Patriots, Mayo recorded a team high 13 tackles and a sack. On March 16, 2020, Mayo signed a three-year contract extension with the team. On September 6, 2020, he was placed on injured reserve with a torn meniscus before being activated on October 16, 2020. Mayo was released on March 4, 2021.

Washington Football Team / Commanders
Mayo signed with the Washington Football Team on March 18, 2021. He was released on August 31, 2021, but re-signed with the team the following day. On December 13, 2021, he was placed on the COVID-19 reserve list. After missing the Week 15 game against the Philadelphia Eagles, he was placed back on the active roster on December 23.

On January 28, 2022, Mayo signed a one-year contract extension with Washington. He re-signed on another one-year contract on February 24, 2023.

NFL statistics

References

External links
Washington Commanders bio
Texas State Bobcats bio

1993 births
Living people
People from St. Helens, Oregon
Players of American football from Portland, Oregon
American football linebackers
Texas State Bobcats football players
Carolina Panthers players
New York Giants players
San Francisco 49ers players
Washington Commanders players
Washington Football Team players